Dinko Tsvetkov Dermendzhiev (2 June 1941 – 1 May 2019), nicknamed Chico was a Bulgarian footballer and coach.

Club career
Dinko Dermendzhiev began his youth career in Maritsa Plovdiv. Initially, he played as a goalkeeper, although later he would be famed as a skillful and elegant forward.

Dermendzhiev spent his entire professional career with Botev Plovdiv, playing for the club for 19 years during the 1960s and 1970s. He participated in 447 matches in A Grupa and scored 194 goals for the club. Dermendzhiev would score twice in eight UEFA club competition games. He also holds the third place in the all time goalscorers ranking of A Grupa. Throughout his career Dermendzhiev scored seven hat-tricks.

International career
He made 58 appearances for the Bulgaria national football team and scored 19 goals from 1966 to 1977. He participated at three editions of FIFA World Cup in 1962 (2 games), 1966 (2 games) and 1970 (2 games and 1 goal), scoring one goal against Peru.

Coaching career
The first team Dermendzhiev coached was Chepinets. He then took charge of Botev Plovdiv, leading the club to win the 1980–81 Bulgarian Cup. On 30 September 1981, under his guidance the club achieved a glorious 1–0 victory over FC Barcelona. Dermendzhiev would spend several spells in charge of Botev. He would also coach local rivals Lokomotiv Plovdiv, as well as Shumen, Lokomotiv Sofia, Spartak Pleven, Maritsa Plovdiv, Omonia Aradippou, Hebar Pazardzhik, Chernomorets Burgas, Bulgaria U21, and have a short spell at Levski Sofia where he achieved 8 wins and 2 draws in 1991.

Honours

Club Honours

Player
 Bulgarian Cup: 1962, Runner-up: 1963, 1964
 A Grupa: 1967, Runner-up: 1963, 3rd place: 1961
 Balkans Cup: 1972

Manager
 Bulgarian Cup: 1981, Runner-up: 1984, 1991
 A Grupa 3rd place: 1981, 1983 
 Balkans Cup Runner-up: 1981

Individual Honours
 Best football player of Plovdiv: 1966, 1967, 1976
 Best football player of Botev Plovdiv for 20th century

References

External links

1941 births
2019 deaths
Bulgarian footballers
Bulgaria international footballers
Botev Plovdiv players
FC Maritsa Plovdiv players
First Professional Football League (Bulgaria) players
Association football midfielders
1962 FIFA World Cup players
1966 FIFA World Cup players
1970 FIFA World Cup players
Bulgarian football managers
Botev Plovdiv managers
PFC Levski Sofia managers
PFC Lokomotiv Plovdiv managers
PFC Hebar Pazardzhik managers
FC Lokomotiv 1929 Sofia managers
Footballers from Plovdiv
Deaths from cerebrovascular disease
Neurological disease deaths in Bulgaria